Lovejoy is a British television comedy-drama mystery series, based on the novels by John Grant under the pen name Jonathan Gash. The show, which ran to 71 episodes over six series, was originally broadcast on BBC1 between 10 January 1986 and 4 December 1994, although there was a five-year gap between the first and second series. It was adapted for television by Ian La Frenais.

Overview

The series concerns the adventures of the eponymous Lovejoy, a roguish antiques dealer based in East Anglia filmed around Long Melford. Within the trade, he has a reputation as a "divvy", a person with almost unnatural powers of recognising exceptional items as well as distinguishing genuine antiques from fakes or forgeries.

Characters
 Lovejoy, played by Ian McShane, a less than scrupulous yet likeable rogue antique dealer  
 Eric Catchpole, played by Chris Jury (series 1–5; guest, series 6), Lovejoy's younger, enthusiastic, but ever so slightly dim, assistant
 Tinker Dill, played by Dudley Sutton, "barker" and tout who is friends with Lovejoy
 Lady Jane Felsham, played by Phyllis Logan (series 1–5; guest, series 6), has a friendly, flirtatious relationship with Lovejoy, often helping him with his deals
 Charlie Gimbert, played by Malcolm Tierney (series 1, 4–5), Lovejoy's landlord and the owner of a local auction house, he is also Lovejoy's nemesis within the antiques trade
 Beth Taylor, played by Diane Parish (series 5–6), Lovejoy's new apprentice following the departure of Eric Catchpole
 Charlotte Cavendish, played by Caroline Langrishe (series 5–6), an auctioneer who becomes Lovejoy's love interest

Broadcast history
The series was notable for its style and pace. Lovejoy would frequently break the fourth wall, revealing his thoughts and motives by addressing the audience directly. The first series was shown on BBC1 in the first half of 1986. It concluded with a two-part special.

Despite the first series being a moderate ratings success, Lovejoy was not brought back until January 1991. The original four cast members returned for the next two series between 1991 and 1992. With the start of the fourth series in 1993, Malcolm Tierney reprised his first series role as Charlie Gimbert.

During the fifth series, several cast changes were made. Phyllis Logan left the show in the second episode and Chris Jury departed in the sixth episode, although both characters returned for the sixth series finale. Two new regular characters were added: Lovejoy's new apprentice, Beth Taylor, and Charlotte Cavendish, who ran a local antiques auction house.

The sixth and final series of ten episodes was broadcast between October and December 1994. Two ninety-minute Lovejoy specials for Christmas were shown in 1992 and 1993. The theme tune used in the opening and end credits, as well as the incidental music for each episode, was composed by Denis King.

Releases
In the United States, the series was first broadcast on the A&E Network. It was marketed as The Lovejoy Mysteries on VHS in the United States. The DVD release of the entire series has returned to the title of Lovejoy.

References

External links

Lovejoy at British TV Resources

Filming locations
Lovejoy TV show makes a comeback

1986 British television series debuts
1994 British television series endings
1980s British comedy-drama television series
1990s British comedy-drama television series
1980s British mystery television series
1990s British mystery television series
BBC television dramas
British crime television series
English-language television shows
Television shows based on British novels